Leigh Richman Collins (5 March 1901 – 4 October 1975) was an English professional footballer who played as a half-back. He played in the Football League for Wigan Borough, Nelson and New Brighton.

He married Mary Beatrice McMinn, and had one daughter, Cynthia Audrey, born 15 April 1927.

References

1901 births
1975 deaths
Footballers from Liverpool
English footballers
Association football midfielders
Wigan Borough F.C. players
Nelson F.C. players
New Brighton A.F.C. players
Crewe Alexandra F.C. players
Stalybridge Celtic F.C. players
English Football League players